Sir Arthur Loftus (died 27 May 1665) was an Anglo-Irish politician and landowner.

He was the son of Sir Adam Loftus and Jane Vaughan. His grandfather was Sir Dudley Loftus. He served as the Member of Parliament for Wexford County in the 1639-49 parliament and was Provost Marshal of Ulster. He was knighted by Charles II. He lived at Rathfarnham, County Dublin.

Loftus married Lady Dorothy Boyle, daughter of Richard Boyle, 1st Earl of Cork and Catherine Fenton, in 1627. However, the Earl of Cork in his diaries records their marriage on Shrove Monday, 13th February 1632 (1631 Old Style).  Their son was Adam Loftus, 1st Viscount Lisburne and their daughter, Lettice, married Humphrey Coningsby.

References

Date of birth unknown
1665 deaths
17th-century Anglo-Irish people
17th-century Irish landowners
Irish MPs 1639–1649
Knights Bachelor
Arthur
Members of the Parliament of Ireland (pre-1801) for County Wexford constituencies